The 1997 Toyota Princess Cup was a women's tennis tournament played on outdoor hard courts at the Ariake Coliseum in Tokyo, Japan that was part of the Tier II category of the 1997 WTA Tour. It was the inaugural edition of the tournament and was held from 15 September through 21 September 1997. First-seeded Monica Seles won the singles title.

Finals

Singles

 Monica Seles defeated  Arantxa Sánchez Vicario 6–1, 3–6, 7–6(7–5)
 It was Seles' 3rd singles title of the year and the 41st of her career.

Doubles

 Monica Seles /  Ai Sugiyama defeated  Julie Halard-Decugis /  Chanda Rubin 6–1, 6–0
 It was Seles' 4th title of the year and the 46th of her career. It was Sugiyama's 2nd title of the year and the 5th of her career.

External links
 ITF tournament edition details
 Tournament draws

Toyota Princess Cup
Toyota Princess Cup
1997 in Japanese tennis
1997 in Japanese women's sport